Lewis James Bell (born 29 September 2002) is an English professional footballer who plays as a midfielder for Gretna 2008 on loan from EFL League Two side Carlisle United.

Playing career
Bell came through the youth-team at Carlisle United and in September 2020 signed his first professional contract, a two-year contract with a one-year club option, to begin in July 2021. He made his first-team debut for the "Blues" on 6 October 2020, coming on as a 54th-minute substitute for Taylor Charters in a 5–3 defeat at Sunderland in the group stages of the EFL Trophy.

In January 2022 he joined Warrington Town on loan.

Statistics

References

2002 births
Living people
Footballers from Carlisle, Cumbria
English footballers
Association football midfielders
Carlisle United F.C. players
Warrington Town F.C. players
English Football League players
Northern Premier League players